Tara Prasad Das is an Indian politician. In 2001 and 2006 he was elected as MLA of Sarukhetri Vidhan Sabha Constituency in Assam Legislative Assembly.

Reference 

Assam MLAs 2001–2006
Assam MLAs 2006–2011
Independent politicians in India
Year of birth missing